Conrad Landry (1938 – October 29, 2022) was a Canadian politician. He served in the Legislative Assembly of New Brunswick from 1982 to 1995, as a Liberal member for the constituency of Kent North. Landry died in 2022 at the age of 83.

References

New Brunswick Liberal Association MLAs
1938 births
2022 deaths